East River Savings Bank may refer to:
291 Broadway, Manhattan
26 Cortlandt Street, Manhattan; see Cortlandt Street (Manhattan)#Buildings
743 Amsterdam Avenue at West 96th Street, the bank's first branch

Bank buildings in Manhattan